Veli-Pekka "Pepe" Teromaa (born 6 April 1956) is a Finnish former motorcycle speedway rider who rode in the British League for Leicester Lions and Coventry Bees in the 1970s.

The younger brother of former Finnish Champion Ila Teromaa, Pepe established himself in speedway racing in Finland, and finished fourth in the Finnish Championship in 1974. In 1975 he signed for Coventry Bees but his season was cut short by injury in his first match. In 1976 he joined his brother at Leicester Lions where he spent two seasons.

References

1956 births
Finnish speedway riders
Coventry Bees riders
Leicester Lions riders
Living people
Sportspeople from Tampere